Víctor Roberto Webster Flashy (born 10 January 1981) is a retired Nicaraguan footballer.

Club career
Born in Nicaragua but raised in Costa Rica, Webster played for the AD Limonense youths before making his senior debut with Pérez Zeledón. He later played for AD Limonense, joined Honduran giants F.C. Motagua in summer 2001 and moved to Real Estelí a year later.

International career
He has represented the Costa Rica national under-17 football team and the Nicaragua U-21's for whom he scored 3 goals at the 2001 Central American Games.

He made his senior debut for Nicaragua in a March 2000 World Cup qualification match against Guatemala and has earned a total of 15 caps, scoring 2 goals. He has represented his country in 3 FIFA World Cup qualification matches and played at the 2001 and 2003 UNCAF Nations Cups.

His final international was a February 2003 UNCAF Cup match against Panama.

International goals
Scores and results list Honduras' goal tally first.

Personal life
Webster was born to Alda Sáenz Flashy and Alex Webster and moved with his parents to Costa Rica when only one and a half years old.

References

External links

Sports archive

1981 births
Living people
People from Carazo Department
Association football forwards
Nicaraguan men's footballers
Nicaragua international footballers
Nicaraguan expatriate footballers
Municipal Pérez Zeledón footballers
F.C. Motagua players
Real Estelí F.C. players
Expatriate footballers in Honduras
2001 UNCAF Nations Cup players
2003 UNCAF Nations Cup players